Yalta (:  Я́лта) is a resort city on the south coast of the Crimean Peninsula in Ukraine surrounded by the Black Sea. It serves as the administrative center of Yalta Municipality, one of the regions within Crimea. Yalta, along with the rest of Crimea, is internationally recognised as part of Ukraine, and is considered part of the Autonomous Republic of Crimea. However, it is occupied by Russia, which annexed Crimea in 2014 and regards the town as part of the Republic of Crimea.

The city is located on the site of the ancient Greek colony of Yalita. It is said to have been founded by the Greek settlers who were looking for a safe shore (Γιαλός, yalos in Greek) on which to land. It is situated on a deep bay facing south towards the Black Sea, surrounded by the mountain range Ai-Petri. It has a warm humid subtropical climate and is surrounded by numerous vineyards and orchards.

The area became famous when the city held the Yalta Conference as part of the Allied World War II conferences in 1945.

The term "Greater Yalta" is used to designate a part of the Crimean southern coast spanning from Foros in the west to Gurzuf in the east and including the city of Yalta and multiple adjacent urban settlements.

History

12th–19th centuries

The existence of Yalta was first recorded in the 12th century by an Arab geographer, who described it as a Byzantine port and fishing settlement. It became part of a network of Genoese trading colonies on the Crimean coast in the 14th century, when it was known as Etalita or Galita. Crimea was captured by the Ottoman Empire in 1475, which made it a semi-independent subject territory under the rule of the Crimean Khanate but the southern coast with Yalta was under direct Ottoman rule forming the Eyalet of Kefe (Feodosiya). Yalta was annexed by the Russian Empire in 1783, along with the rest of Crimea, sparking the Russo-Turkish War, 1787-1792. Prior to the annexation of the Crimea, the Crimean Greeks were moved to Mariupol in 1778; one of the villages they established nearby is also called Yalta.

In the 19th century, the town became a fashionable resort for the Russian aristocracy and gentry. Leo Tolstoy spent summers there and Anton Chekhov in 1898 bought a house (the White Dacha) here, where he lived until 1902; Yalta is the setting for Chekhov's short story, "The Lady with the Dog", and such prominent plays as The Three Sisters were written in Yalta. The town was also closely associated with royalty. In 1889 Tsar Alexander III finished construction of Massandra Palace a short distance to the north of Yalta and Nicholas II built the Livadia Palace south-west of the town in 1911.

20th century

During the 20th century, Yalta was the principal holiday resort of the Soviet Union. In 1920, Vladimir Lenin issued a decree "On the Use of Crimea for the Medical Treatment of the Working People" which endorsed the region's transformation from a fairly exclusive resort area into a recreation facility for tired proletarians. Numerous workers' sanatoria were constructed in and around Yalta and the surrounding district. There were, in fact, few other places that Soviet citizens could come for a seaside holiday, as foreign travel was forbidden to all but a handful. The Soviet elite also came to Yalta; the Soviet premier Joseph Stalin used the Massandra Palace as his summer residence.

Yalta was occupied by the German Army from 9 November 1941 to 16 April 1944.

The town came to worldwide attention in 1945 when the Yalta Conference between the "Big Three" powers – the Soviet Union, the United States and the United Kingdom – was held at the Livadia Palace.

21st century
Following the dissolution of the Soviet Union in 1991, Yalta has struggled economically. Many of the nouveaux riches of ex-Soviet citizens began going to other European holiday resorts, now that they had the freedom and money to travel; conversely, the impoverishment of many ex-Soviet citizens meant that they could no longer afford to go to Yalta. The town's transport links have been significantly reduced with the end of almost all passenger traffic by sea. The longest trolleybus line in Europe goes from the train station in Simferopol to Yalta (almost 90 km). Yalta is crowded in the vacation season (July–August) and prices for accommodation are very high. Most of the tourists are from countries of the former Soviet Union; in 2013, about 12% of tourists to Crimea were Westerners from more than 200 cruise ships.

Yalta has a beautiful seafront promenade along the Black Sea. People can be seen strolling there all seasons of the year, and it also serves as a place to gather and talk, to see and be seen. There are several beaches to the east and west of the promenade. Many kinds of pine trees (Stone pine and Aleppo pine for example), oleander shrubs, lemon and olive trees and different sorts of palm trees such as the Chinese windmill palm, the Mexican fan palm and the Canary Island date palm are scattered all over the city. The town has several movie theaters, a drama theater, plenty of restaurants, and several open-air markets.

Two beaches in Yalta are Blue Flag beaches since May 2010, these were the first beaches (with two beaches in Yevpatoria) to be awarded a Blue Flag in a CIS member state.

In 2014, Russia, in violation of international law, invaded Crimea and claimed it as part of Russia.

Main sights

Famous attractions within or near Yalta are:
Yalta's Sea Promenade (Naberezhnaya), housing many attractions, which was renovated in 2003 and 2004.
Saint Hripsime Church of Yalta, an Armenian Church, with frescoes by V. Surenyants
A Roman Catholic Church built by Nikolay Krasnov
Yalta's cable car, taking visitors to the Darsan hill, from which one can see Yalta's shoreline
Renovated Hotel Taurica, the first hotel in the former Russian Empire with elevators
Alexander Nevsky Cathedral, constructed by the architect Krasnov, who also constructed the Livadia Palace and the architect P. Terebenyov
Former main building of the Ministry of Defence hotel, built in the style of a Gothic castle
Palace of Bukhara Emir
Yalta's Zoo
Yalta's Aquarium, housing small dolphins
Park-museum Polyana Skazok (Glade of Fairytales)
White Dacha – House-museum of Anton Chekhov
House-museum of Lesya Ukrainka
House with Caryatids, where the composer A. Spendiarov lived
Yalta Hotel Complex
Roffe Bath, historical monument

Moreover, Yalta's suburbs contain:
Foros Church
Nikitsky Botanical Garden (Nikita)
Livadia Palace (Livadiya)
Organ hall in Livadiya
Massandra Palace (Massandra)
Massandra Winery and Vaults
International children's centre of Artek(Gurzuf)
Ai-Petri Mountain (1233 metres high, with a cable car traveling to and from the mountain)
Alupka Palace
Swallow's Nest castle near Gaspra.
Tsar's Path hiking trail

Geography

Climate 
As Yalta lies to the south of the Crimean Mountains and, within an amphitheatre of hills, the climate is mild. Yalta has a humid subtropical climate (Köppen climate classification: Cfa) that closely borders on a hot-summer Mediterranean climate (Köppen climate classification: Csa). According to the Trewartha climate classification the climate is Do (oceanic.) In February, the average temperature reaches . Snow is infrequent and melts soon thereafter. In July, the average temperature reaches . The sun shines approximately 2,169 hours per year. Since the city is located on the shore of the Black Sea, the weather rarely becomes extremely hot due to the cool sea breezes.

Demographics
As of the Ukrainian Census conducted on 1 January 2001, the population of Yalta is 80,500. The main ethnic groups of Yalta are: Russians (65.5%), Ukrainians (25.7%), Belarusians (1.6%), and Crimean Tatars (1.3%). The majority of people speak Russian as their mother tongue.
This total number does not comprise the population of neighbouring villages and small towns. The metropolitan area population is about 139,500.

Twin towns – sister cities

Yalta is twinned with:

 Antalya, Turkey
 Baden-Baden, Germany
 Batumi, Georgia
 Eilat, Israel
 Fujisawa, Japan
 Grozny, Russia
 Kaluga, Russia
 Santa Barbara, United States
 Khachmaz, Azerbaijan
 Latakia, Syria
 Luhansk, Ukraine
 Margate, England, United Kingdom
 Nice, France
 Pozzuoli, Italy
 Rhodes, Greece
 Salsomaggiore Terme, Italy
 Sanya, China
 Sharm El Sheikh, Egypt
 Ulan-Ude, Russia
 Vladikavkaz, Russia

See also 

 List of cities in Ukraine

References

External links

The murder of the Jews of Yalta during World War II, at Yad Vashem website.

 
Cities in Crimea
Yaltinsky Uyezd
Populated coastal places in Ukraine
Populated coastal places in Russia
Port cities and towns in Ukraine
Port cities and towns in Russia
Seaside resorts in Ukraine
Seaside resorts in Russia
Yalta Municipality
Populated places of the Byzantine Empire
Port cities of the Black Sea
Cities of regional significance in Ukraine
Holocaust locations in Russia
Holocaust locations in Ukraine
Greek colonies in Crimea
Territorial disputes of Ukraine